Koziróg Rzeczny  is a village in the administrative district of Gmina Tłuchowo, within Lipno County, Kuyavian-Pomeranian Voivodeship, in north-central Poland.

References

Villages in Lipno County